Emile Masson (Morialmé, 16 October 1888 — Bierset, 25 October 1973) was a Belgian professional road bicycle racer. Masson won two stages in the 1922 Tour de France. His son, Émile Masson Jr., also became a successful cyclist.

Major results

1919
Tour of Belgium
1922
1922 Tour de France:
Winner stages 11 and 12
1923
Bordeaux–Paris
Tour of Belgium
Sclessin – St. Hubert – Sclessin
GP Wolber
1924
Jemeppe – Bastogne – Jemeppe
Paris-Lyon

External links 
Official Tour de France results for Emile Masson (senior)
Emile Masson profile at the Cycling Website (in English but with some mistakes)
 Biography of Emile Masson(in French but without any mistakes)

Belgian male cyclists
1888 births
1973 deaths
Belgian Tour de France stage winners
Cyclists from Namur (province)
People from Florennes